Zinnur Sarı (4 April 1947 – 9 August 2007) is a retired Turkish football defender and later manager.

References

1947 births
2007 deaths
Turkish footballers
Altay S.K. footballers
Turkish football managers
Altay S.K. managers
Association footballers not categorized by position